Miguel Alexandre Cabral Machado (born May 8, 1975) is a former competition swimmer from Portugal, who represented his country at the 1996 Summer Olympics in Atlanta, Georgia.

Machado was born in Porto, Portugal. He attended the Faculty of Engineering at Porto University and the Strathclyde University, Glasgow, Scotland, where he swam for the City of Glasgow Swim Team (COGST).

Machado represented the Clube Fluvial Portuense at a younger age, but made his debut on the Portuguese National Team as a swimmer from FC Porto.

From 1996 to 2007 Machado also represented other Portuguese Clubs such as CDUP - Centro Desportivo e Universitário do Porto and the Clube Naval do Funchal from the Atlantic Madeira Island.

Miguel was the 100m freestyle (short course) Portuguese national record holder between 1995 and 1996, with the mark of 51.02s.

He later played water polo at the Clube Naval Povoense, a club located at Povoa de Varzim, a small town located a few miles north of Porto.

He retired from competitive swimming in 2008, but in 2015, following his move to the UK, Miguel has returned to the pools and has joined the City of Coventry Swim Team as a Masters swimmer.

Since then, he has participated in several national and international Masters Swimming events.

In 2016, at the LEN European Masters Championships in London, Miguel classified 4th place on the 100 m freestyle, his best international achievement ever.

In 2017 in Budapest, at the XVII FINA WORLD MASTERS CHAMPIONSHIPS, Miguel swam the 50m, and also the 100m freestyle, where he classified 9th overall, setting a new Portuguese record for the distance.

In October 2019, at the Swim England Masters National Championships at Pond's Forge International Sports Centre in Sheffield, Miguel and his teammates Matt Wardle, James Wardle and Neal Smith (Kenilworth Masters SC) were rewarded with a British record in the  freestyle relay, bringing the mark down from 3:34.41 to 3:33.29.

References

Swimmers at the 1996 Summer Olympics
1975 births
Living people
Portuguese male freestyle swimmers
Olympic swimmers of Portugal
Sportspeople from Porto